The Hohe Warte is a hill in the 19th district of the city of Vienna, Döbling between Heiligenstadt and Unterdöbling. There is also a street with the same name. In the 19th century, a number of villas were built on the Hohe Warte because it offered good views of the surrounding areas. Today, the Hohe Warte is best known firstly as the site of the Zentralanstalt für Meteorologie und Geodynamik (Central Bureau for Meteorology and Geodynamics), which is also often referred to as the Hohe Warte because of its address, secondly for the former presidential villa of the Austrian Bundespräsident, and thirdly for the stadium Casino-Stadion Hohe Warte.

In 1872, the Zentralanstalt für Meteorologie und Geodynamik relocated from Wieden to the Hohe Warte; its new home had been built by Heinrich von Ferstel between 1870 and 1872. The institute is responsible inter alia for Austria’s daily weather reports. In 1957, the complex on the Hohe Warte was greatly expanded, and in 1967 and 1973 a radar tower, a facility for filling hot air balloons and a new office tower were added. This office tower today also houses a large library with a collection specialising in meteorology and geophysics.

The Hohe Warte is also the site of a well-known sporting facility in the form of the Casino-Stadion Hohe Warte. This stadium is the home ground of the First Vienna FC, which has been crowned Austrian champion six times, the Austrian national rugby team and the Raiffeisen Vikings Vienna, the Austrian and European champions in American Football. When it was opened in 1921, the stadium was the largest and most modern football stadium in continental Europe. International matches such as between Austria and Italy in 1923 were watched by as many as 80,000 people on the largest open viewing area in Europe at the time.

Since the stadium was renovated in 2005-2006, it can now seat 5500 fans. The City of Vienna now prohibits the use of the open viewing area.

The sporting arena on the Hohe Warte also played host to opera performances and boxing matches in the 1920s. The first open-air opera performance in Vienna’s history took place here in 1924 when Pietro Mascagni conducted the opera Aida. The audience was arranged on an “amphitheatre-like parquet”; 17,000 could sit and a further 8,000 stood to watch the performance. The stage was almost 50 metres wide and 35 metres deep and was filled by a cast including soloists, a 200-strong choir and 700 extras. In 1935, a second season of opera was put on, featuring performances of Aida, Pagliacci und Cavalleria Rusticana. Live camels and elephants were used in performances that were watched by 18,000 seated and 14,000 standing audience members.

To the north of the stadium, the Döblinger Bad provides both an open-air and an indoor swimming pool.

The Hohe Warte can be reached with metro line 4 (the U4) and tram lines 37 and D.

References 

Döbling
Streets in Vienna
Hills of Vienna